Sergei Nikolaevich Tereschenko (born December 28, 1991) is a Russian professional ice hockey defenceman. He is currently playing for HC 21 Prešov of the Slovak Extraliga.

Tereschenko made his Kontinental Hockey League (KHL) debut playing with Metallurg Magnitogorsk during the 2011–12 KHL season.

Awards and honors

References

External links

1991 births
Living people
Amur Khabarovsk players
HC Donbass players
Metallurg Magnitogorsk players
Russian ice hockey defencemen
Salavat Yulaev Ufa players
Traktor Chelyabinsk players
People from Magnitogorsk
Sportspeople from Chelyabinsk Oblast
HC 21 Prešov players
Russian expatriate sportspeople in Ukraine
Russian expatriate sportspeople in Slovakia
Expatriate ice hockey players in Ukraine
Expatriate ice hockey players in Slovakia
Russian expatriate ice hockey people